The Union Party for the People, or Party of the U, is a liberal political party in Colombia. The Party is led by former president Juan Manuel Santos. It was formerly Colombia's largest political party, in a coalition with the Liberal Party and Radical Change, until it lost 7 seats in the 2018 parliamentary elections and presidential elections.

History

The Party was formed in 2005, with the objective of uniting various congressional supporters of President Alvaro Uribe, also known as Uribistas, into one political party, and to provide a political platform for the 2006 Colombian presidential elections. Most of its members defected from the Colombian Liberal Party, yet it failed to unite all Uribistas: in particular the Radical Change (Cambio Radical) refused to join.

In 2006, the party took part in the parliamentary elections, in which it won 30 out of 166 deputies and 20 out of 100 senators. Three years later, more than half of the congressmen from the Radical Change Party changed their standing towards the Party of the U, which resulted in it becoming Colombia's largest political party.

For 2010 presidential elections, Party of the U chose former Defense Minister Juan Manuel Santos as a presidential candidate and Governor Angelino Garzon as a vice presidential candidate. Juan Manuel Santos was elected with 69% of the vote in the runoff. The Party also obtained 27 seats in the Senate in the 2010 congressional elections.

In 2012, the Uribistas and former President Alvaro Uribe along with Francisco Santos Calderon decided to form their own separate party, the Democratic Center. This was the result of constant intervention and criticism from former President Alvaro Uribe towards his presidential successor Juan Manuel Santos.  The announcement of peace negotiations with the FARC and the Colombian Government was a partial factor that led to the fragmentation. Nevertheless, the party did not suffer high-level defections towards the Democratic Center. It came first in the Senate elections, followed in second place by the Democratic Center led by Alvaro Uribe who then became a Senator.

In 2014, President Juan Manuel Santos was re-elected for a second term, in a close race against former cabinet colleague and ex-Finance Minister Oscar Ivan Zuluaga of the Democratic Center.

The party has yet to officially announce its electoral strategy for 2018, but it is widely expected to form an electoral alliance with the Liberal Party.

Ideological platform
The Programmatic Declaration (Declaración Programática) is the official ideological platform of the party.

 The Social Party of National Unity supports the development of the welfare state and recognises the family as the base of society. 
 The Party supports the implementation of a market-based economy. 
 It promotes globalisation, emphasising education, science, and technology as key pillars that can help Colombia succeed in a global market. 
 The Party supports decentralisation and more autonomy of the regions. Currently, the Caribbean Region is the first to begin the process to obtain more autonomy.
 President Santos has also claimed that he supports Tony Blair's Third Way approach.

Since 2012, the party has been an observer member of the Liberal International.

Electoral history

Presidential elections

Legislative elections

References

External links

Conservative parties in Colombia
Conservative liberal parties
Liberal parties in Colombia
Political parties established in 2005